Daphne Helena Koster (born 13 March 1981) is a retired Dutch football player, who played as a defender for Ajax in the Vrouwen Eredivisie. She also played in the American Women's Professional Soccer (WPS) for Sky Blue FC. A powerful centre back, she was the captain of both the Netherlands women's national football team and Ajax.

Koster made her senior national team debut as a 16-year-old in August 1997 against Switzerland. At the time, she was playing for a boys' amateur club, SVA Assendelft, where she played until under-19 level.

In 2009, Koster was a mainstay of the Dutch national team, which reached the semi-finals of UEFA Women's Euro 2009 in Finland. In June 2013, national team coach Roger Reijners selected Koster for the Netherlands' squad for the UEFA Women's Euro 2013 in Sweden.
She became manager of women's football for Ajax, and is part of changing the culture in the club after the incident with Marc Overmars.

International goals
Scores and results list the Netherlands goal tally first.

References

External links
 
 Profile  at OnsOranje
 WPS profile

1981 births
Living people
Dutch women's footballers
Netherlands women's international footballers
Women's Professional Soccer players
Expatriate women's soccer players in the United States
NJ/NY Gotham FC players
FIFA Century Club
Footballers from The Hague
Eredivisie (women) players
AFC Ajax (women) players
Telstar (women's football club) players
AZ Alkmaar (women) players
Women's association football defenders
Dutch expatriate women's footballers
Dutch expatriate sportspeople in the United States
Ter Leede players
Women's association football managers
AFC Ajax (women) managers
Dutch football managers
21st-century Dutch women